Henryk Nielaba (born 5 September 1933) is a Polish fencer. He won a bronze medal in the team épée event at the 1968 Summer Olympics.

References

1933 births
Living people
Polish male fencers
Olympic fencers of Poland
Fencers at the 1964 Summer Olympics
Fencers at the 1968 Summer Olympics
Fencers at the 1972 Summer Olympics
Olympic bronze medalists for Poland
Olympic medalists in fencing
Sportspeople from Katowice
Medalists at the 1968 Summer Olympics
20th-century Polish people
21st-century Polish people